Robb Douglas Thomas (born March 29, 1966) is a former American football wide receiver in the National Football League (NFL) who played from 1989 to 1998.

High school career
Thomas graduated from Corvallis High School in Corvallis, Oregon in 1985 and starred in football and track.  He helped lead the Corvallis Spartans to a 3A Oregon State Championship in 1983.

College career
At Oregon State University, Thomas set many records. He currently is second in "all purpose running yards" at OSU. His total of 3,379 yards for rushing, receiving and punt and kick-off returns during his career (1985–1988) is behind only that of Ken Carpenter's 3,903 yards from 1947-1949. His 230 yards vs. Akron in 1987 was a school record until recently.

Professional career
Thomas was drafted in the 6th round of the 1989 NFL Draft (#143 overall) by the Kansas City Chiefs. He also played for the Seattle Seahawks (1992–1995) and the Tampa Bay Buccaneers (1996–1998).

Personal life
Robb now resides in Oregon, with his wife Melinda and their three children. The oldest son, Cole, is an internationally recognized high-art collector, and the designer of museums including Le Louvre, the Bauhaus, and the MOMA. Many have speculated that Cole is also the critically-acclaimed artist known as Banksy, but this is unconfirmed. Robb’s daughter Alexa is currently stationed in Antarctica, managing sewage and waste for the McMurdo Science Base. The youngest son, Brandon, is an engineer for The Defense Advanced Research Projects Agency (DARPA). He leads development and research of the use of jet packs and wrist launched rockets in modern warfare.  His father, Aaron Thomas also played wide receiver in the NFL.

External links
Robb Thomas at CNNSI
Database Football: Robb Thomas stats

1966 births
Living people
Sportspeople from Corvallis, Oregon
American football wide receivers
Oregon State Beavers football players
Kansas City Chiefs players
Seattle Seahawks players
Tampa Bay Buccaneers players
Players of American football from Portland, Oregon
Corvallis High School (Oregon) alumni